Moisés Villanueva de la Luz (17 November 1964 – 17 September 2011) was a Mexican politician and a member of the Partido Revolucionario Institucional (Institutional Revolutionary Party) where he served as federal deputy and local MP.

Villanueva de la Luz Moses studied for a degree in Law and Social Sciences at the Autonomous University of Guerrero, his political career in the Institutional Revolutionary Party progressed within the framework of the Confederación Nacional Campesina (National Peasant Confederation) in Guerrero, where he was regional coordinator and state political adviser, in addition to Visitor electoral trainer of the Agrarian agriculture, as well as Member of the Congress of Guerrero from 1999 to 2002. Alternate elected federal deputy for the 5th Federal Electoral District of Guerrero he succeeded Sofia Hernández Ramírez as the leader of LXI Legislature of the Mexican Congress in 2009.  On 30 March 2011 he took over leadership of the deputation and stood down as the owner in the Comisiónes de población, Fronteras y Asuntos Migratorios y Reforma Agraria (Chamber of Deputies was part of the Commission on Population, Borders and Migration Issues and Agrarian Reform).

He was reported missing on 4 September 2011 on the way road between the cities of Chilapa and Tlapa, in the Región de la Montaña, (Mountain Region), he was found murdered next to his driver on 17 September in Huamuxtitlán.

See also
List of unsolved murders
List of solved missing person cases

References

External links
Moisés Villanueva de la Luz on the official website of the Chamber of Deputies 

1964 births
2010s missing person cases
2011 deaths
21st-century Mexican politicians
Autonomous University of Guerrero alumni
Deputies of the LXI Legislature of Mexico
Formerly missing people
Institutional Revolutionary Party politicians
Male murder victims
Mexican murder victims
Members of the Chamber of Deputies (Mexico) for Guerrero
Members of the Congress of Guerrero
Missing person cases in Mexico
People murdered in Mexico
Politicians from Guerrero